William Poteat may refer to:

William H. Poteat (1919–2000), philosopher, scholar and professor
William Louis Poteat (1856–1938), professor and then president of Wake Forest College